The 2005 season was the 13th season since the establishment of J.League. It began on March 5 and ended on December 3, followed by promotion/relegation series matches on December 7 and 10.

General

Promotion and relegation 
 At the end of the 2004 season, Kawasaki Frontale and Omiya Ardija were promoted to J1
 At the end of the 2004 season, there were no relegation to J2.
 At the end of the 2004 season, Tokushima Vortis and Thespa Kusatsu were promoted to J2 from JFL

Changes in competition formats 
 The Division 1 was expanded to 18 clubs, and Division 2 stays at 12 clubs.
 The format of Division 1 was changed from the double-season format to a single season.
 In games that require extra time in case of a tie (i.e. league cup finals), golden goal rules were eliminated. Clubs now had to play the full extra time.

Changes in clubs 
 JEF United relocates from Ichihara to the prefecture capital, Chiba, and becomes JEF United Ichihara Chiba.

Honours

Clubs 

Following eighteen clubs played in J.League Division 1 during 2005 season.  Of these clubs, Omiya Ardija and Kawasaki Frontale were newly promoted clubs.

 Kashima Antlers
 Urawa Red Diamonds
 Omiya Ardija 
 JEF United Chiba
 Kashiwa Reysol
 FC Tokyo
 Tokyo Verdy 1969
 Kawasaki Frontale 
 Yokohama F. Marinos
 Albirex Nigata
 Shimizu S-Pulse
 Jublio Iwata
 Nagoya Grampus Eight
 Gamba Osaka
 Cerezo Osaka
 Vissel Kobe
 Sanfrecce Hiroshima
 Oita Trinita

Format 
Eighteen clubs will play in double round-robin (home and away) format, a total of 34 games each. A club receives 3 points for a win, 1 point for a tie, and 0 points for a loss. The clubs are ranked by points, and tie breakers are, in the following order: 
 Goal differential 
 Goals scored 
 Head-to-head results
A draw would be conducted, if necessary.  However, if two clubs are tied at the first place, both clubs will be declared as the champions. The bottom two clubs will be relegated to J2, while the 16th placed club plays a two-legged Promotion/relegation Series.
Changes from previous year
 Number of clubs competing increased from 16 to 18
 The season format was changed from the double-season format to a single season.
 Number of games per club increased from 30 games to 34 games per season.

Table

Results

Top scorers

Attendance figures

Awards

Individual

Best Eleven 

* The number in brackets denotes the number of times that the footballer has appeared in the Best 11.

References

External links 
J.LEAGUE Official Stats (English)
2005 J.LEAGUE Season, Club, and Player Stats (English)
Complete J1 & J2 Results from 2005 Season (RSSSF)

J1 League seasons
1
Japan
Japan